Diplacus mephiticus is a species of monkeyflower known by the common names  skunky monkeyflower and foul odor monkeyflower. It was formerly known as Mimulus mephiticus.

It has been reclassified as Mimulus nanus (now Diplacus) var. mephiticus.

Distribution
The species is native to the Sierra Nevada and western Great Basin of California and Nevada.

Description
Mimulus nanus var. mephiticus is a diminutive summer annual growing to a height of 15 cm (usually much smaller, especially at high elevation).

The oppositely arranged leaves are linear or lance-shaped and up to 3 centimeters in length. The leaves emit an unpleasant scent when crushed, the characteristic that earned the plant its name.

The trumpet-shaped flower may be up to 2 centimeters long and has an upper lip with two lobes and a lower lip with three. The flower is magenta or yellow, and populations occasionally have plants with both colors. The lower lip of the flower is marked with purplish lines and spots.

See also
List of plants of the Sierra Nevada (U.S.)

Diplacus nanus

References

External links
Calflora Database: Mimulus nanus var. mephiticus (Skunky monkeyflower)
Jepson eFlora (TJM2): Mimulus nanus var. mephiticus
USDA Plants Profile for Mimulus nanus var. mephiticus (foul odor monkeyflower)
UC Photo gallery

mephiticus
Flora of California
Flora of Nevada
Flora of the Sierra Nevada (United States)
Flora of the Great Basin
Flora without expected TNC conservation status